Gardenville is an unincorporated community which is located in Plumstead Township in Bucks County, Pennsylvania, United States.

History
The Gardenville–North Branch Rural Historic District was added to the National Register of Historic Places in 1991.

Geography
Gardenville is located at the intersection of Pennsylvania Route 413 and Point Pleasant Pike.

Notable residents
John P. Fullam (1921-2018), United States District Court judge for the Eastern District of Pennsylvania, was born in Gardenville.

References

Unincorporated communities in Bucks County, Pennsylvania
Unincorporated communities in Pennsylvania